Abdul Halim (27 December 1911 – 4 July 1987) was an Indonesian politician, who served as the 4th Prime Minister of Indonesia.

Family and education
Abdul Halim was born on 27 December 1911, in Bukittinggi, West Sumatra, to Achmad St. Mangkuto and Hj. Darama. At the age of 7, Abdullah, his mother's cousin, who at that time was one of the leaders of Bataafsche Petroleum Maatscappij (BPM – now known as Pertamina) took him to Jakarta in order to obtain a better education. Halim attended HIS, MULO, AMS B and Geneeskundige Hoge School (Medical School) in Jakarta.

Career
Abdul Halim was involved in various activities, from the politics to education to sports. He was the fourth Prime Minister of the Republic of Indonesia during the period January 1950 – September 1950. He was also the first Minister of Defense of the Republic of Indonesia (September 1950 in the Natsir Cabinet).
Halim also made a contribution in the establishment of the Emergency Government of the Republic of Indonesia (PDRI) in Central Sumatra, together with Johannes Leimena and Muhammad Natsir.
As a doctor, Abdul Halim was the director of RSUP (now Dr. Cipto Mangunkusumo Hospital, or RSCM) from July 1951 until July 1961, and worked as Inspector General until his death on 4 July 1987.

Away from politics, Halim, who had a hobby playing football, was involved in the formation of the Voetbalbond Indonesische Jacatra team (now Persija) in 1928, and was the Chairman of VIJ (Persija) for several years. From 1951 to 1955 he was Vice Chairman and then Chairman of the Olympic Committee of Indonesia (KOI). Halim was appointed chairman of the National IKADA Foundation to build the Ikada Stadium Merdeka Field, Central Jakarta. In 1952 he led the first Indonesian contingent to participate in the Olympics.

References

1911 births
1988 deaths
Defense ministers of Indonesia
Indonesian collaborators with Imperial Japan
Members of the Central Advisory Council
Minangkabau people
National Heroes of Indonesia
People from Bukittinggi
Prime Ministers of Indonesia